Come into My Life is the debut album by American singer-songwriter Joyce Sims, released in 1987. It was the first Sleeping Bag Records album to be released on compact disc in the United States, and it was licensed to London/PolyGram Records throughout Europe.

The album's title track became Sims' biggest hit single, reaching number 10 on the US Billboard R&B Chart and number 7 in the UK Singles Chart. The album contains the full version of the title track, the hard version of "Lifetime Love", and "(You Are My) All and All". However, for unknown reasons, the soft version of "Lifetime Love", despite getting as much radio airplay as the hard version, was not included—but the UK remix of "All and All" was.

Sims wrote all of the songs on the album except for "Love Makes a Woman", a cover of a Barbara Acklin song.

Single releases
"All and All" (peaked at 69 on the US Billboard R&B chart and number 16 on the UK Singles Chart)
"Come into My Life" (US R&B number 10/UK number 7)
"Lifetime Love" (US R&B number 23/UK number 34)
"Love Makes a Woman" (US R&B number 29/UK number 85)
"Walk Away" (US R&B number 56/UK number 24) released with remixes by Clivillés & Cole

Track listing
All tracks written by Joyce Sims, unless otherwise noted.

In media
 The title track was featured in the HBO mini-series Show Me a Hero
 The title track influenced the Indian song "Dheere Dheere" by Nadeem–Shravan
 The title track is heard playing on the radio in the 1995 film Species, in a scene where the alien Sil escapes pursuit in a stolen BMW

Charts

Certifications

References

1987 debut albums
Joyce Sims albums
Sleeping Bag Records albums
Albums produced by Kurtis Mantronik
Freestyle music albums